Op Hoop van Zegen is a 1900 Dutch play.

Op Hoop van Zegen may also refer to:

 Op Hoop van Zegen (1918 film), a 1918 film
 Op Hoop van Zegen (1924 film), a 1924 film
 Op Hoop van Zegen (1934 film), a 1934 film
 Op Hoop van Zegen (1986 film), a 1986 film